Kathellen Sousa Feitoza (born 26 April 1996), commonly known as Kathellen, is a Brazilian professional footballer who plays as a centre back for Spanish Primera División club Real Madrid CF and the Brazil women's national team. She is a product of the American college soccer system.

Club career
As a young girl Kathellen loved football but mainly had to play futsal. She found opportunities for field soccer limited in her native Baixada Santista, especially after Santos FC's women's section was closed in 2012.

Kathellen applied for an athletic scholarship to the United States and was selected by Monroe College of the National Junior College Athletic Association. After two successful years with Monroe College she spent her two remaining years of college eligibility with Louisville Cardinals and UCF Knights, respectively, in NCAA Division I.

She subsequently received an offer from FC Girondins de Bordeaux and joined the French Division 1 Féminine club halfway through their 2017–18 season. In May 2018 she signed a two-year extension to her contract.

After a successful 2019 FIFA Women's World Cup with Brazil, and an elite level performance against France, Kathellen was linked to many major European clubs, including newly promoted CD Tacón, due to become Real Madrid for season 2020–21. Instead she remained with Bordeaux for a further season, then joined Italian Serie A club Inter Milan in August 2020.

International career

Brazil women's national football team head coach Vadão called Kathellen up for the first time in June 2018, for a training camp ahead of the 2018 Tournament of Nations. As the tournament fell outside the FIFA International Match Calendar, some regular national team players were not released by their clubs, causing Vadão to consider other players.

On 26 July 2018, she earned her first cap for the senior Brazil women's national team at the 2018 Tournament of Nations, appearing as a substitute for Daiane Limeira in a 3–1 defeat by Australia.

A year later, Kathellen was subsequently called up by Brazil for the 2019 FIFA Women's World Cup. She started the preparation camp as the main backup for the experienced pair of centre backs Mônica and Érika. After Érika was forced out of the competition by injury, Kathellen was made a regular starter. Despite being the youngest Brazilian player in the lineup for the Round of 16 game thriller against France, Kathellen delivered a major performance.

References

External links
 
 Profile at Footofeminin.fr 

1996 births
Living people
Brazilian women's footballers
Brazil women's international footballers
Women's association football defenders
Expatriate women's footballers in France
Brazilian expatriate sportspeople in France
Division 1 Féminine players
People from São Vicente, São Paulo
Expatriate women's soccer players in the United States
Brazilian expatriate sportspeople in the United States
Brazilian expatriate women's footballers
UCF Knights women's soccer players
Louisville Cardinals women's soccer players
FC Girondins de Bordeaux (women) players
2019 FIFA Women's World Cup players
Inter Milan (women) players
Expatriate women's footballers in Italy
Brazilian expatriate sportspeople in Italy
Serie A (women's football) players
Monroe Mustangs women's soccer players
Footballers from São Paulo (state)
Brazilian expatriate sportspeople in Spain
Primera División (women) players
Expatriate women's footballers in Spain
Real Madrid Femenino players